The 2017–18 season was Oxford United's second consecutive season in League One and their 124th year in existence. As well as competing in League One, the club participated in the FA Cup, EFL Cup and EFL Trophy.

Before the start of the season, manager Michael Appleton resigned to become assistant manager at Leicester City. His replacement Pep Clotet, formerly assistant manager at Leeds United, in contrast to Appleton's policy of signing promising young British players, signed a mix of foreign players, among them Dwight Tiendalli, Xemi Fernández, Ivo Pękalski, Agon Mehmeti and Ricardinho (the first Brazilian to play for Oxford), and seasoned British pros including Jonathan Obika from rivals Swindon Town, James Henry, Mike Williamson and John Mousinho. A number of influential players, among them Chey Dunkley, Liam Sercombe, top scorer Chris Maguire, captain John Lundstram and record signing Marvin Johnson, left the club. Incoming loanees included Jack Payne from Huddersfield Town and Gino van Kessel from Slavia Prague. Striker Kane Hemmings and defender Charlie Raglan were given season-long loans at Mansfield Town and Port Vale respectively. Curtis Nelson was appointed club captain following the departure of Lundstram.

Results started reasonably with an away win over Oldham Athletic (who were to be relegated at the end of the season) and a home win over Portsmouth in front of what turned out to be the club's largest home crowd of the season. After 15 games the club were in the play-off places, but form declined through the late autumn. Curtis Nelson ruptured his Achilles tendon during a home defeat to Northampton Town in November, and John Mousinho was appointed captain in his place (until Nelson's eventual return in April). Oxford suffered a record 7–0 home defeat at the hands of eventual champions Wigan Athletic on 23 December. During the January transfer window, Payne was recalled by his parent club, Xemi was released from his contract and Robert Dickie and Cameron Brannagan were signed from Reading and Liverpool respectively. Three young loanees were recruited from Premier League clubs: Isaac Buckley-Ricketts and Ashley Smith-Brown from Manchester City and Todd Kane from Chelsea.

After a home defeat to bottom club Bury, Clotet was sacked with the club in 10th place. Caretaker-manager Derek Fazackerley presided over the team for two months, in which time they won only twice in eight games and dropped to 15th place.

Midway through Fazackerley's tenure, the club announced that Thai businessman Sumrith Thanakarnjanasuth, formerly a member of the owning consortium at rivals Reading, had become the new owner of the club. Thanakarnjanasuth appointed Karl Robinson as the club's permanent manager on 22 March 2018. Robinson had to wait five games for his first win, but his aim of retaining the club's League One status was achieved with three wins from the last five games of the season. The club finished in 16th place on 56 points, six points above the relegation zone.

United were eliminated by lower-league opposition in the opening rounds of the League Cup and FA Cup, by Cheltenham Town and Port Vale respectively. Having been losing finalists for the previous two seasons, they reached the last 8 of the EFL Trophy but were eliminated by Chelsea U21s.

Midfielder James Henry and striker Wes Thomas were the club's leading scorers, each with 11 goals (10 in the League). For the second season running, goalkeeper Simon Eastwood played every minute of every league game, though he was rested for a couple of EFL Trophy matches. Midfielder Ryan Ledson, the subject of persistent transfer rumours, was voted the Supporters' Player of the Season.

Transfers

Transfers in

Transfers out

Loans in

Loans out

Competitions

Friendlies
Oxford United played six pre-season friendlies, against Oxford City, Middlesbrough and Hull City (in Portugal), Brentford, Birmingham City and Leeds United. A proposed friendly against Lincoln City was cancelled.

League One

League table

Result summary

Results by matchday

Matches
On 21 June 2017, the league fixtures were announced.

FA Cup

On 16 October 2017, Oxford United were drawn away to Port Vale in the first round.

EFL Cup

On 16 June 2017, Oxford United were drawn at home to Cheltenham Town in the first round.

EFL Trophy

Squad statistics

Appearances and goals

Top scorers

Disciplinary record

References

Oxford United
Oxford United F.C. seasons